The March 75A was an open-wheel formula racing car, designed, developed and built by British manufacturer and constructor, March Engineering, for Formula 5000 racing, in 1975. It was based on the March 761 Formula One car. Unlike most other F5000 cars of the time, which used  V8 engines, the 75A used a smaller  Ford-Cosworth GAA V6 engine (which was still allowed; and permitted with F5000 regulations), which produced between  @ 9,000 rpm, depending on tuning and spec. Engines up to  could be used, so this was still perfectly in line with the regulations.

References

March vehicles
Formula 5000 cars